Scott Gerald Sanders (born March 25, 1969) is an American former professional baseball right-handed pitcher who played from –. In his career, Sanders played for the San Diego Padres (1993–), Seattle Mariners, Detroit Tigers (1997–1998), and Chicago Cubs (1999).

In his MLB career, Sanders compiled a 34-45 record and a 4.86 ERA. He appeared in 235 games, with 88 starts. In  innings pitched, he recorded 632 strikeouts. In his one season in NPB, Sanders had a 3-5 record and a 4.36 ERA. In 24 games, including 11 starts, he pitched  innings with 70 strikeouts.

References

External links

1969 births
Living people
Albuquerque Isotopes players
American expatriate baseball players in Canada
American expatriate baseball players in Japan
Baseball players from Missouri
Buffalo Bisons (minor league) players
Calgary Cannons players
Chicago Cubs players
Detroit Tigers players
Edmonton Trappers players
High Desert Mavericks players
Iowa Cubs players
Las Vegas Stars (baseball) players
Major League Baseball pitchers
Nicholls Colonels baseball players
Nippon Ham Fighters players
Nippon Professional Baseball pitchers
People from Hannibal, Missouri
Sacramento River Cats players
San Diego Padres players
Seattle Mariners players
Spokane Indians players
Peoria Chiefs players
Thibodaux High School alumni
Waterloo Diamonds players
Wichita Wranglers players